The Economic and Labour Relations Review is a quarterly peer-reviewed academic journal covering the fields of economics, labour relations, and policy. The editors-in-chief are Diana Kelly (University of Wollongong) and Anne Junor (University of New South Wales). The journal was established in 1990 and is published by Cambridge University Press in association with the School of Business, University of New South Wales.

Abstracting and indexing
The journal is abstracted and indexed in Scopus and the Social Sciences Citation Index. According to the Journal Citation Reports, the journal has a 2021 impact factor of 2.500.

References

External links
 

Cambridge University Press academic journals
English-language journals
Economics journals
Labour journals
Quarterly journals
Publications established in 1990